Cedar Dunes Provincial Park is an ocean-front provincial park in Prince Edward Island, Canada. It is located south of West Point, facing the Northumberland Strait.

References 

Provincial parks of Prince Edward Island
Parks in Prince County, Prince Edward Island